Abdulkerim Abbas, also Abdul Kerim Abbas, Abdulkerim Abbasoff, 'Abd al-Karīm 'Abbās (1921 – 27 August 1949), was a Uyghur leader in Xinjiang, China during the 20th century.  He helped lead the Ili Rebellion of 1944, which led to the founding of the Second East Turkestan Republic (Three Districts) in northern Xinjiang. Abbas, along with Ehmetjan Qasim, headed the Marxist faction within the Three Districts, which in 1946 set aside the rebellion's declaration of independence and joined the Nationalist Chinese in forming a coalition provincial government.  Qasim and Abbas led the Three Districts in joining the Chinese Communists toward the end of the Chinese Civil War.   They and several other senior leaders of the Three Districts perished in August 1949 in a plane crash while traveling en route to Beiping (Beijing) where they were invited to participate in the Chinese Communists' political consultative conference, which resulted in the founding of the People's Republic of China.  Abbas is officially in hailed in the People's Republic of China as a revolutionary martyr.

Biography

Early life
Abdulkerim Abbas was born in 1921 in Przhevalsk, Soviet Union, now Karakol, Kyrgyzstan. His family was native to Artux in far western Xinjiang and in 1926 moved to Yining.  Abbas attended primary school in Uqturpan (Wushi) in southern Xinjiang and then enrolled in the Xinjiang Province No. 1 Middle School in the provincial capital, Dihua (now Urumqi) in 1936.  The school was one of the first modern multi-ethnic schools in the region.  Abbas began to learn Chinese and joined an anti-imperialist society organized by Chinese Communist Party (CCP) members.  In 1937, he met Saifuddin Azizi, who had returned from exile in the Soviet Union and gave him books on Marxism-Leninism.  In August 1938, Abbas enrolled in the High School of the Xinjiang Academy and studied under political science teacher, Lin Jilu, who was a Chinese Communist.  Liu tutored Abbas in Chinese and Mao Zedong's writings.  Abbas also learned about the guerilla warfare tactics of the Chinese Red Army and the Long March.  In 1939, he participated in the Xinjiang Academy Summer Tour Group to Ili, organized by Academy president Du Chongyuan, and toured his home region of western Xinjiang with Chinese Communist activists.

At that time, Sheng Shicai, the ruler of Xinjiang who had been friendly to the Soviet Union, shifted his political allegiance to the Chinese Nationalist government, and launched a crackdown on leftist pro-Soviet activities.  Abbas' father was arrested and Abbas was expelled from school and sent to teach at a primary school in Shawan County in the Junggar Basin of northern Xinjiang.  In Shanwan, he translated Mao Zedong's essay On Protracted War into Uyghur.  In 1942, he was permitted to return home to Yining where he initially taught at the Ili High School for Girls and then served as an interpreter for the local government.

Ili Rebellion

In April 1944, Abbas along with the influential Yining imam Elihan Tore and Rahimjan Sabir Khoja formed the 12-person Yining Liberation Organization to free the region of Nationalist rule.  To evade government surveillance, Abbas relocated to Korgas where he received assistance and materiel from the Soviet Union.  In September 1944, Sheng Shicai tried to seek Stalin's favor again and was recalled from Xinjiang by the Nationalist government.  Sheng's recall left a power vacuum and several rebellions sprang out in northern Xinjiang.

In October 1944, Abbas returned to Yining with a guerilla force and on November 7, 1944, launched the Ili Rebellion.  Abbas and Soviet advisor Peter Romanovich Alexandrov led 60 men in seizing the bridge over the Ili River.  Nationalist troops sent to retake the bridge were ambushed and the city was effectively cut off from government reinforcements.  Other rebel forces from Nilka fought into the city and quickly seized control.  Nationalists strongholds were taken with the support of Soviet warplanes and artillery.  After taking Yining, the revolutionaries massacred large numbers of Nationalist prisoners and Han Chinese residents.

The revolution drew support from Islamists, Pan-Turkic nationalists and Marxists, and spread to Ili, Tarbagatai  (Tacheng) and Ashan (Altay). On November 11, 1944, the revolutionaries founded the Second East Turkestan Republic in Yining with Elihan Tore as the chairman of the provisional government.  Abdulkerim Abbas became the Interior Minister.

Unlike the Islamists and Turkic nationalists, who wanted to create a pan-Turkic regime in Xinjiang, Abbas regarded the revolution as a struggle against Nationalist Chinese repression and capitalist exploitation of the working-class people of all ethnicities. He opposed a proposal to remove all Han Chinese from Yining to concentration camps in Künes County.  He issued orders protecting Han Chinese residents in Ili and moved the families of Han friends and associates into his house for protection.  After the fighting ceased in Yining, the ETR government, at his direction, created a Han Affairs Office to assist Han Chinese residents, published a Chinese newspaper, reopened the Han Primary School and founded an orphanage for Han children.

On April 8, 1945, the various guerilla and partisan units of the revolution was organized into the Ili National Army (INA) and Abbas became its political director.  The INA was a multiethnic army led by Uyghurs, Kazakhs, Kyrgyz and Russians with Hui, Mongol and Xibe cavalry brigades and some Han Chinese recruits.  With the support of Soviet advisors and military personnel, the INA launched a series of offensives to expand ETR control beyond the Ili Valley.

In July, Abbas led the southern prong of the INA's breakout offensive toward Aksu.  Abbas' forces captured the passes through Tian Shan that connect the Ili Valley with the Tarim Basin in August, tookBaicheng on September 2, and took Wensu on September 6.

After the Nationalist Chinese government and the Soviet Union concluded the Sino-Soviet Treaty of Friendship and Alliance of 1945 on August 14, the USSR, under pressure to cease support for the Ili rebels, began pull support for the ETR.  To improve the ETR's political bargaining position, Elihan Tore ordered the INA to accelerate attacks in early September.

Abbas surrounded Aksu the on September 7, but Nationalist defenders led by Zhao Hanqi fought back fiercely and broke the siege on September 13.  Abbas' brother, Siyiti Abbas, and other imprisoned ETR activists inside Aksu, were executed by Nationalist authorities.   In mid-September, Abbas resumed the siege with reinforcements from the Soviet advisor Nasyrov and Tore's son, but after weeks of desperate fighting, was forced to abandon the campaign on October 6.  Six days later, the ETR and the Nationalists began peace talks in Dihua.  In February 1946, they reached a peace accord.

Coalition government

In July 1946, after further negotiations between Zhang Zhizhong of the Nationalist Chinese government and Ehmetjan Qasim of the ETR, the two sides agreed to form a coalition provincial government with Zhang as chairman and Qasim as vice-chairman.  Abdulkerim Abbas was appointed as deputy-secretary general.  Qasim and Abbas agreed to set aside the ETR's declaration of independence.  Elihan Tore was removed from Xinjiang to the Soviet Union.  In December 1946, Abbas attended the National Assembly in Nanjing as a delegate from Xinjiang.

While in Nanjing, Abbas met secretly with Dong Biwu, a CCP delegate from Yanan, and asked for CCP support.  He explained that the Xinjiang Communist Alliance had 15,000 members and its leadership had sought to join the Communist Party of the Soviet Union but did not receive permission.  Dong immediately cabled Zhou Enlai, who replied that the CCP would welcome cooperation with the Xinjiang Communist Alliance (新疆共产主义者同盟) and would agree in principle CCP membership for leaders of the alliance.  Abbas took back to Xinjiang, documents from the CCP's 7th National Congress and radio equipment.  The radio, however, was not sufficiently powerful to reach Yanan from Xinjiang and the two Communist groups could not establish regular communication.  Back in Xinjiang, under Abbas' leadership, two Marxist organizations, the People's Revolutionary Party (人民革命党) and the Xinjiang Communist Alliance merged to form the Democratic Revolution Party (民主革命党).  Abbas became the chair of the DRP's Central Committee.

In 1947, after Zhang Zhizhong left the province, relations between the ETR and Nationalists factions deteriorated under the chairmanship of Masud Sabri, whom the ETR leaders regarded as anti-Soviet.  As full-scale civil war broke out between the Nationalists and Chinese Communists in China Proper and Manchuria, the Nationalists persuaded Osman Batur, a Kazakh leader to defect from the Ili government.  Thereafter, Qasim and Abbas returned to Yining from Urumqi and openly supported the Chinese Communists.  On August 1, 1947, they founded the Union to Protect Peace and Democracy in Xinjiang (新疆保卫和平民主同盟), which incorporated the DRP and other leftist groups in Yining.  Qasim was the chair of the Union and Abbas served as a member of the Union's central committee.

In February 1948, Abbas propagated Mao Zedong's People's Liberation Army Proclamation and Disciplinary Code in Uyghur to Ili National Army.  As the Chinese Communists took control of the civil war against the Nationalists, Abbas moved the Ili government moved closer to the CCP.  In May 1949, he reportedly announced: 

In the late summer of 1949, after Liu Shaoqi visited Moscow in June and persuaded Stalin to facilitate the transfer of Xinjiang through political means to the CCP, Deng Liqun arrived in Yining on August 17 to establish contact with the ETR leadership.  Deng met with Qasim and Abbas and conveyed Mao Zedong's invitation to the political consultative conference in Beiping (Beijing), which the Ili leaders accepted.

Death
According to Chinese state sources, Abdulkerim Abbas and Ehmetjan Qasim, along with Ishaq Beg Munonov, Dalelkhan Sugirbayev, and Luo Zhi departed Yining for Beiping (Beijing) on August 22, 1949.  They traveled by car to Almaty and on August 23, 1949 flew to Novosibirsk, where they were delayed by reports of inclement weather. The delegation, not wishing to miss the conference in Beiping, reportedly insisted on continuing the journey and departed Novosibirsk on August 25, 1949. The plane crashed in poor weather in the Lake Baikal region on August 26, 1949 and all aboard perished. Abdulkerim Abbas was 28 years old.

News of the crash reached Yining on September 3, 1949 and Saifudin Aziz led another Ili government delegation to Beijing on September 7, 1949.  This delegation flew from Yining to Chita and then reached Beiping on September 15 by train via Manzhouli and Shenyang.

Conspiracy Theories
The cause of the plane crash is highly disputed. Many Uyghur and Western scholars argued that the alleged inclement weather was just an excuse for the plane crash, the members of the delegation were in fact assassinated by the Chinese authorities, who likely made a deal with the leader of the replacement delegation Saifudin Aziz.

Personal

While Abbas was working at the Middle School for Girls in Yining, he fell in love with Yang Fengyi, a colleague, despite Uyghur tradition against relationships out of the faith and the disapproval of Yang's father who was the head of the local Han merchants' association.    During Ili Rebellion, Abbas sheltered the Yang family at his home.  When Abbas fell ill, Yang Fengyi (杨凤仪) nursed him for 40 days back to health.  In the spring of 1945 as fighting between Nationalists and the Ili rebels intensified, Yang Fengyi felt extreme family and social pressure.  In April, Yang Fengyi committed suicide using Abbas' pistol.  In a parting letter, she explained that she was a person who observed no ethnic boundaries but could not tolerate the atrocities committed around her.  She wrote that she had died for him, asked him to protect her family and urged him to live on "for me, for the revolution and for the people of all nationalities in Xinjiang."  Abbas was heartbroken by Yang's death and ordered bans against killings of civilians.

After Yang's death, Abbas married Lü Suxin (吕素新), a student of Yang's.  The couple had two sons and one daughter.

Legacy
In the People's Republic of China, Abdulkerim Abbas is remembered as a martyr and hero in the struggle against the Nationalist regime. His remains were returned to China in April 1950 and later reburied in a martyrs' memorial cemetery in Yining.  The cemetery has a stele with calligraphy by Mao Zedong, praising Abbas and his fellow martyrs for their contributions to the Chinese people's revolution and mourning their death en route to the Inaugural Chinese People's Political Consultative Conference in Beijing.

References

Works referenced

1921 births
1949 deaths
Uyghur people
Political office-holders in Xinjiang
20th century in Xinjiang
Victims of aviation accidents or incidents in the Soviet Union
China–Soviet Union relations
East Turkestan independence activists
People from Issyk-Kul Region